Medina, Texas may refer to the following places in Texas:
Medina, Bandera County, Texas, an unincorporated community
Medina, Zapata County, Texas, a census-designated place
Medina County, Texas

See also
Rio Medina, Texas, an unincorporated community in Medina County